Muscle Memory is the debut solo album by ex-Reuben front man Jamie Lenman. It was released on 11 November 2013 by Xtra Mile Recordings. The album is a double album featuring one disc of Thrash Metal and Hardcore Punk inspired songs and another disc of Folk, Jazz and Big-Band inspired songs. The album was praised for its diversity and praised Lenman's knack for "riffery and chord progressions."

Track listing

Personnel
Jamie Lenman - All other instruments and vocals except as listed below
Dan Kavanagh - Drums, Maracas
Basia Bartz - Violin, Cello on "If You Have To Ask You'll Never Know"
Kathryn Lenman - Vocals on "If You Have To Ask You'll Never Know" and "It's Hard To Be a Gentleman"
Jeremy Lenman - Vocals on "Little Lives"
Sean Genockey - Guitar on "Shotgun House"
The Jimmy Lemon Good Times Big Band
The Aldershot Male Voice Choir

References

2013 albums
Jamie Lenman albums
Crossover thrash albums
Thrash metal albums by English artists
Folk albums by English artists
Big band albums
Xtra Mile Recordings albums